Boone County Courthouse may refer to:

 Boone County Courthouse (Arkansas), Harrison, Arkansas
 Boone County Courthouse (Illinois), Belvidere, Illinois
 Boone County Courthouse (Indiana), Lebanon, Indiana
 Boone County Courthouse (Iowa), Boone, Iowa
 Boone County Courthouse (Missouri), Columbia, Missouri
 Boone County Courthouse (Nebraska), Albion, Nebraska
 Boone County Courthouse (West Virginia), Madison, West Virginia